I Corps is a military field formation of the Indian Army. The Corps is headquartered at Mathura in Uttar Pradesh. It was raised on 1 April 1965. It was still being raised when it was despatched to the front in 1965. Raised as the First Strike Corps of the Indian Army, it was launched into operations in the Sialkot sector. The Corps conducted a counteroffensive during the Indo-Pakistani War of 1965. In the 1971 war against Pakistan, it took part in the Battle of Basantar.

Indo-Pakistani War of 1971
During 1971, the composition of the corps was:

X Sector
36th Infantry Division (8, 115 Brigades initially)
39th Infantry Division
54th Infantry Division

Present Day
In 2021, the Strike One Corps was shifted to Northern Command from the South Western Command to focus on Sino-Indian border in Ladakh.

The I Corps created in 1965 and headquartered at Mathura, consists of the following formations:
4 RAPID Division (Allahabad, Uttar Pradesh), also called Red Eagle Division.
7 Infantry Brigade (Kanpur)
41 Infantry Brigade (Lucknow)
62 Infantry Brigade (Kanpur)
4 Artillery Brigade (Allahabad)
6 Mountain Division (Bareilly, Uttar Pradesh) also called Garud Division
14 (Independent) Armoured Brigade, also called Black Chargers Brigade

The following were moved to direct command of South Western Command
33 Armoured Division (Hisar Military Station, Haryana), also called Dot On Target (DOT) Division, consisting of -
33 Artillery Brigade
39 Armoured Brigade (formerly 39th Mechanised Brigade)
57 Armoured Brigade (formerly 57th Mechanised Brigade)
88 Armoured Brigade (formerly 88th Mechanised Brigade).
42 Artillery Division (Bassi, Rajasthan), also called Strategic Striker Division.

List of General Officers Commanding

Notes

References 
Richard A. Renaldi and Ravi Rikhe, 'Indian Army Order of Battle,' Orbat.com for Tiger Lily Books: A division of General Data LLC, 2011.
www.globalsecurity.org

Military units and formations established in 1965
001